Benjamin Cross (23 August 1898 – 1986) was an English professional footballer who played as an inside forward for Burnley.

He stood 5 ft 6ins and weighed 9st 10 lbs.

Cross was born in Birkenhead and played for junior teams there. During the first World War he played for Liverpool, and then joined Burnley which at that time were one of the best UK teams. He Forged a famous attacking partnership with Weaver, and captained England schoolboys against Scotland at the international level, going on to play for England. He holds an English league championship medal for 1920–21 season.

References

English footballers
Association football inside forwards
Burnley F.C. players
English Football League players
1898 births
1986 deaths
English Football League representative players
Sportspeople from Birkenhead